Futures exchanges establish a minimum amount that the price of a commodity can fluctuate upward or downward. This minimum fluctuation (trade increment) is known as a tick or commodity tick. Hence, a tick is any fluctuation in the price of a security.

Each futures contract has a different size, quantity, valuation etc., so each tick size that can be applied to anyone's futures contract, is dependent on the previous variables. Tick size is important as it determines the possible prices available. For example, each "tick" for the grain market (soybeans, corn and wheat) is 0.25 cents per bushel, on one 5,000-bushel futures contract.

See also
Percentage in point (PIP)
Tick size
NASDAQ futures

References

External links
Futures Contract Specifications (Tick Values)

Derivatives (finance)

id:Bursa komoditi#Daftar nilai kode